Auchtermuchty ('upland of the pigs/boar') is a town in Fife, Scotland.

History

Until 1975 Auchtermuchty was a royal burgh, established under charter of King James V in 1517. There is evidence of human habitation in the area dating back over 2,000 years, and the Romans are known to have established a camp in the southeast corner of the town. In the past, the linen industry was a major source of work in the town, but in the early 18th century the firm of John White was established, bringing the town its first foundry (there were two eventually). The town also had a distillery - Stratheden Whisky Distillery, set in the town centre - from 1829 to 1926, but it had to close when Prohibition in the United States drastically reduced the demand for its products. 

As in many parts of Fife, there is much evidence of the impact of both World Wars on the village. To the north east of the town, a concrete observation platform was built on what is thought to be a long used site of strategical and defensive importance, as it overlooks the entire village and the remains of earlier walls and structures are evident. During the Second World War the flat farmland of the glacial valley in which Auchtermuchty sits made a prime target for glider landings in the event of an invasion.

Buildings

The old part of the town is based around a hill. The twisting streets here have a wealth of buildings dating from the 17th and 18th century, centred on Auchtermuchty Town House (now used as the town library).

The church (on the east side of the hill) is a simple Georgian box chapel, but with an interesting double bell within its western bellcote. Gravestones date back to the 17th century. A more modern cemetery dating from around 1910 lies to the south-east of the town, partly concealed by industrial units. Maps from the mid-19th century show no less than five churches in use at one time.

The war memorial, designed by the architect Reginald Fairlie, portrays a Scottish soldier with head bowed.

Amenities
Auchtermuchty Golf Club (now defunct) was founded in 1902. The club ceased to exist following the Second World War.

Cultural references
Auchtermuchty was the setting of "The Wife of Auchtermuchty", a comic Scots poem of the late Middle Ages.
 
The town was used as the location for Tannochbrae in the 1990s ITV series Dr. Finlay.

The town's church is mentioned in James Hogg's The Private Memoirs and Confessions of a Justified Sinner, as was Herald Law, a hill to the north of the village, in an area known historically as "The Holy Land".

In The Family Ness theme song, "You'll Never Find A Nessie In The Zoo", the refrain states "You can go to Auchtermuchty and to Drumnadrochit too, but you'll never find a Nessie in the zoo".

Auchtermuchty was often referred to by John Junor in the Daily Express: "John Junor's editorial approach was simple: articulate the fears and preoccupations of Middle England and liven them up with dollops of hokey Scottish folk wisdom. In his column for the paper, Junor lit upon the small Scottish town of Auchtermuchty and made it into his own personal Brigadoon, a place of solemn courtesy to one's betters and implacable hostility to outsiders."

Auchtermuchty is repeatedly mentioned by heavy metal band Gloryhammer, especially as the fictional birthplace of keyboard player Zargothrax (played by Christopher Bowes).

Notable people

 Sir John Arnott, MP and founder of Arnotts department stores in Dublin
 James Ferrier, 4th Mayor of Montréal, Canada

 John Glas, founder of the Glasite religious sect
 Marian Leven, artist
 Captain George Moodie, first captain of the clipper ship Cutty Sark, lived his final years in Auchtermuchty
 Charlie and Craig Reid, musicians and founders of folk/rock group The Proclaimers
 Sir Jimmy Shand, folk musician
 Dr John Shoolbred FRSE, naval surgeon
 James Campbell Walker, architect

See also
List of places in Fife

References

External links
Auchtermuchty Community web portal

 
Towns in Fife
Royal burghs
Parishes in Fife